Marco Cardenas (born 29 June 1967), better known by his stage name MC Magic, is an Mexican-born American rapper, songwriter and record producer known for singing and rapping, both in English and Spanish. He is also known for taking all credit for NB Rydaz title in which rappers Dos and Zigzag curently own by copyright.

Background

Early life
MC Magic was born Marco Cardenas on June 29, 1967, in Nogales, Sonora, Mexico. At the age of five, his family immigrated to the United States and Cardenas grew up in Phoenix, Arizona. At the age of thirteen, his friend Rob taught him to play the drum machine and Cardenas began working as a Dj. He graduated from Agua Fria High School in 1985.

Magic City
Having been the drive behind Nastyboy's undertakings, MC Magic was primed to release his second solo album in 2006. The May release, Magic City, peaked at number one on the Billboard's Top Heatseekers chart and at number 60 for Top R&B/Hip-Hop albums. But in the end the song was criticized as, " not that good  The critics were later proven wrong by his upcoming hits. He brought in much money from the later albums but none were ever are as popular and greatly loved as "Magic City".

Magic City Part 2

Magic City'''s success opened up many new opportunities for him but mostly it established MC Magic as a solo act. MC Magic's newfound success as a solo artist motivated him to continue his successful run, with his follow-up album Magic City Part II which was released in June 2008. Magic City Part II featured some of the hottest artists in the game with guest appearances from Baby Bash, Too Short, Chingo Bling, Big Gemini, and DJ Kane of the Kumbia Kings. Magic City Part II peaked at number 6 on the Billboard's Top Heatseekers chart and contained hit songs such as "Princesa", "Girl I Love You" and "The Only 1". As MC Magic's career started to take off rapidly, he started to tour continuously all over the States; the shows ranged from small venues to huge arenas.

The Rewire

MC Magic decided to continue to expand his solo music catalog and started to record songs for his new album The Rewire. Eventually he released the album's first single "Mrs. Delicious". The record was uptempo, completely different from his usual R&B style but it seemed to work. Even though The Rewire was completed by late December, it was set to be released on Valentine's Day of 2011. MC Magic promoted his upcoming album repeatedly in his hometown of Phoenix, with huge billboards and bus benches throughout the city. Later he expanded his promotion on to one of his largest markets, California, also placing bus benches throughout the city of Los Angeles and surrounding areas. The release of MC Magic's highly anticipated album The Rewire was pushed to an earlier date and was released on February 8, 2011. All the heavy promotion for the album proved successful, as his release party for the album in his hometown at a local mall brought in an enormous crowd, so much so that the autograph line led all the way out of the store into the mall. This album contained several hits for MC Magic such the single "Diggin", which is an uptempo rap record, produced by The Orphanz featuring Twista and upcoming rapper Snow Tha Product. The single took off quickly; several radio stations started to pick it up and had it in heavy rotation. As MC Magic released "Diggin",  he also introduced his first all Spanish Rap Banda record called "Todos Mis Diaz" hoping to compete in the Spanish market.

Other work
He has also made personal appearances at Phoenix Valley elementary schools, such as Rose Linda Elementary School in the Roosevelt School District. MC Magic was the morning DJ on Power 98.3 Magic City Radio in Phoenix, Arizona and continues to inspire his fans. In Mexico, MC Magic has made appearances in Urban Fest 2 and collaborated with C-Kan to produce singles like "Quiero Que Sepas", "Loco", and "Mujer Bonita" (A Mexican remix of "Pretty Girl")

Discography

Studio albums

Other albums
 1998: Desert Funk! 2008: Princess/Princesawith Nastyboy Klick
 1997: The First Chapter 1998: The Second Comingwith NB Ridaz
 2001: Invasion (Nastyboy) 2001: Invasion (Upstairs) 2004: NB Ridaz.com 2008: Greatest Hits''

Singles
 1995: "Lost in Love"
 1998" "I Know You Want Me" (featuring CeCe Peniston)
 2006: "All My Life" (featuring Nichole)
 2006: "Sexy Lady" (featuring DJ Kane)
 2006: "Lies" (featuring Krystal Melody)
 2008: "Princess"
 2008: "Princesa"
 2008: "Dancer" (featuring Too $hort, C-Note and AZ Prince)
 2008: "Dancer (Remix)" (featuring Too $hort, Kid Brown and AZ Prince)
 2009: "Girl I Love You" (featuring Zig Zag)
 2010: "Mrs. Delicious"
 2011: "Reasons" (featuring Mrs. Krazie & D. Salas)
 2011: "Diggin" (featuring Twista & Snow Tha Product)
 2011: "Todo Mis Dias (Diaz)"
 2013: "Eres Reina"
 2014: "Venezuela" (featuring Dee Garcia & C-Kan)
 2014: "Million Dollar Mexican" (featuring Big Gemini & GT Garza)
 2014: "Missing You" (featuring Nichole)
 2014: "No Me Importa Nada"
Note: Sophia Maria also sang "Te odio"

References

External links

 Official MySpace
 Nasty Boy Records Official Website
 MC Magic Official Fansite

Living people
Mexican male rappers
Mexican record producers
Mexican songwriters
Male songwriters
People from Nogales, Sonora
Musicians from Phoenix, Arizona
Mexican emigrants to the United States
Mexican male singers
Singers from Sonora
1970 births
Hispanic and Latino American rappers